The Grub-Street Journal, published from 8 January 1730 to 1738, was a satire on popular journalism and hack-writing as it was conducted in Grub Street in London. It was largely edited by the nonjuror Richard Russel and the botanist John Martyn.  While he disclaimed it, Alexander Pope was one of its contributors, continuing his satire which he had started with The Dunciad.

After its end, The Literary Courier of Gruber Street succeeded it for a few months.

References

Bibliography
 Facsimile reprint in 4 volumes.

External links
 Grub Street: The Literary and the Literatory in Eighteenth-Century Britain
 Grub Street Journal, first four volumes, at Hathi Trust

1730 establishments in England
1738 disestablishments in Great Britain
Cultural history of the United Kingdom
Defunct magazines published in the United Kingdom
Essays in literary criticism
Magazines disestablished in 1738
Magazines established in 1730
Satirical magazines published in the United Kingdom